Three Young Texans is a 1954 American Western film directed by Henry Levin and starring Mitzi Gaynor, Keefe Brasselle and Jeffrey Hunter.

Plot
A couple of cowboys, Johnny Colt and Tony Ballew, both have a romantic interest in tomboy Rusty Blair while working for her father. Tony loses his wages gambling, then borrows money from Johnny and wins $700, which they intend to put toward a ranch of their own.

Johnny's nervous because his father Jim is also a gambler. Jim goes to Mexico, gets drunk, catches a man named McAdoo cheating at cards, then shoots him in self-defense. McAdoo's two associates, Catur and Joe, decide to blackmail Jim into helping them rob a train of its $50,000 in payroll loot. If he refuses, they'll tell the law Jim shot their friend in cold blood.

To help his father, Johnny robs the train first. He hides the money with the $700. A posse is formed, which Johnny joins to go search for a thief who is actually himself.

McAdoo turns out to have been wounded, not killed. He turns up and Tony is shot in the back. McAdoo and Catur are done away with in a gunfight, and when Joe flees on horseback from Johnny, he falls to his death over a cliff. Johnny returns the robbery money, then ends up with a $10,000 reward and Rusty to boot.

Cast
 Mitzi Gaynor as Rusty Blair
 Keefe Brasselle as Tony Ballew
 Jeffrey Hunter as Johnny Colt
 Harvey Stephens as Jim Colt
 Dan Riss as Sheriff Carter
 Michael Ansara as Apache Joe
 Aaron Spelling as Catur
 Morris Ankrum as Jeff Blair
 Frank Wilcox as Bill McAdoo
 Helen Wallace as Martha Colt

References

External links

1950s American films
1950s English-language films
1954 films
1954 Western (genre) films
20th Century Fox films
American Western (genre) films
Fictional trios
Films directed by Henry Levin